Sean Daniel Jordan (born 1965) is a United States district judge of the United States District Court for the Eastern District of Texas.

Education 

Jordan received his Bachelor of Arts, summa cum laude, from the University of Texas at Austin and his Juris Doctor, with honors, from the University of Texas School of Law.

Legal career 

Prior to entering private practice Jordan served as Principal Deputy Solicitor General for the State of Texas, representing the state in appeals in both federal and state courts. From 2012 to 2019, he was a partner in the Austin, Texas, office of Jackson Walker L.L.P. He was the co-chair of the firm's Appellate Practice Group, where his practice focused on appellate and complex civil litigation and regulatory compliance.

Military service 

Jordan served in the United States Army as an infantryman and paratrooper in the 82nd Airborne Division.

Federal judicial service 

On January 16, 2019, President Donald Trump announced his intent to nominate Jordan to serve as a United States district judge for the United States District Court for the Eastern District of Texas. On January 17, 2019, his nomination was sent to the Senate. President Trump nominated Jordan to the seat vacated by Judge Richard A. Schell, who assumed senior status on March 10, 2015. On March 5, 2019, a hearing on his nomination was held before the Senate Judiciary Committee. On April 4, 2019, his nomination was reported out of committee by a 12–10 vote. On July 30, 2019, the Senate voted 54–36 to invoke cloture on his nomination. His nomination was confirmed later that day by a 54–34 vote. He received his judicial commission on August 20, 2019.

Memberships 

Jordan has been a member of the Federalist Society since 2016.

References

External links 
 
 Appearances at the U.S. Supreme Court from the Oyez Project

1965 births
Living people
20th-century American lawyers
21st-century American lawyers
21st-century American judges
Federalist Society members
Judges of the United States District Court for the Eastern District of Texas
People from New York City
Texas lawyers
United States Army soldiers
United States district court judges appointed by Donald Trump
University of Texas at Austin alumni
University of Texas School of Law alumni